Radha Devi Jageshwari Memorial Medical College and Hospital, established in 2021, is a private medical college and hospital located at Muzaffarpur, Bihar. This college offers the Bachelor of Medicine and Surgery (MBBS) courses and has an annual intake capacity of 100. This college is affiliated with the Aryabhatta Knowledge University and recognized by the National Medical Commission.

See also

References

Medical colleges in Bihar
Educational institutions established in 2021
2021 establishments in Bihar
Hospitals in Bihar
Colleges affiliated to Aryabhatta Knowledge University